Ramón Areces Rodríguez (1904 in La Mata (Grado), Asturias, Spain – 1989 in Madrid, Spain) was a Spanish businessman.

At fifteen, Areces emigrated to Havana, Cuba. There he learned the basics of the business working at EL ENCANTO Department Store. He later traveled through the United States and Canada, before returning to Spain.  When he returned to Madrid in 1935, he opened up a small tailor shop on the calle Preciados. Areces used the techniques he learned on his trip, and his business grew, quite unexpectedly. In July 1940 he opened the first El Corte Inglés department store in Madrid, Spain.

1904 births
1989 deaths
People from Oviedo (Asturian comarca)
20th-century Spanish businesspeople
Businesspeople from Asturias
Date of death missing